Mitromorpha hernandezi is a species of sea snail, a marine gastropod mollusk in the family Mitromorphidae.

Description
The length of the shell attains 4.5 mm.

Distribution
This marine species occurs off Equatorial Guinea.

References

 Rolàn, E. & Gori, S., 2012. New species of neogastropods from the islands of the Gulf of Guinea, West Africa. Iberus 30(1): 53–66

External links

hernandezi
Gastropods described in 2012